Night of Joy was an annual contemporary Christian music festival that took place from 1983 to 2017 at Walt Disney World Resort in Florida. The festival was normally hosted at the Magic Kingdom in early September. It was cancelled in 2018 and replaced with a mainstream Eat to the Beat concert series, with Christian pop rock artists MercyMe and Tauren Wells joining the lineup. Night of Joy inspired two other Christian rock festivals in the Orlando region: Cornerstone Florida, which ran in the month of May from 2003 to 2007, and Rock the Universe at Universal Studios Florida, in operation since 1998.

Venues
Most concerts were held at the Magic Kingdom, in front of the Cinderella Castle. Other venues included:
 Disney's Hollywood Studios for the 2008 and 2009 concerts
 ESPN Wide World of Sports Complex for the 2016 and 2017 concerts

Six artists have performed at all three venues: Casting Crowns, Chris Tomlin, MercyMe, Newsboys, Red and tobyMac. Several other artists have performed at two of these venues.

Later Years (2010-2017)

2017

Friday, September 8:
 TobyMac
 MercyMe
 Zach Williams
 Natalie Grant
 Danny Gokey
 Matt Maher
 Colton Dixon
 Rend Collective

Saturday, September 9 (cancelled):
 Amy Grant
 Steven Curtis Chapman
 Kirk Franklin
 Jordan Feliz
 Crowder
 Jeremy Camp
 Tye Tribbett

The event returned at the ESPN Wide World of Sports and was scheduled to last two nights, but the September 9 event was cancelled as a precautionary measure against Hurricane Irma. Park tickets for September 9 could either be honored on September 8 or returned for a full refund.

2016

Friday, September 9:
 Stars Go Dim
 Matthew West
 Francesca Battistelli
 Zealand Worship
 Crowder
 Chris Tomlin
 OBB
 MercyMe
 Casting Crowns
 Thruflyte

Saturday, September 10:
 Veridia
 Thousand Foot Krutch
 Hillsong Young & Free
 RED
 For King & Country
 Tim Timmons
 Switchfoot
 Derek Minor
 Newsboys

2015

Friday, September 11:
TobyMac
MercyMe
Jeremy Camp
Colton Dixon
Big Daddy Weave
Francesca Battistelli
Rend Collective
I Am They

Saturday, September 12:
Skillet
Lecrae
For King & Country
Mandisa
Matt Maher
Jamie Grace
Seventh Time Down
Veridia

2015

Friday, September 11:
TobyMac
MercyMe
Jeremy Camp
Colton Dixon
Big Daddy Weave
Francesca Battistelli
Rend Collective
I Am They

Saturday, September 12:
Skillet
Lecrae
For King and Country
Mandisa
Matt Maher
Jamie Grace
Seventh Time Down
Veridia

2014

Friday, September 5:
Matthew West
Chris Tomlin
Hillsong United
Building 429
Mandisa
For King and Country
Matt Maher
The Neverclaim

Saturday, September 6:
MercyMe
Phil Perry
Casting Crowns
Skillet
Colton Dixon
Britt Nicole
Israel Houghton & New Breed
1 Girl Nation
We as Human
Rhett Walker Band

2013

Friday, September 6:
MercyMe
Steven Curtis Chapman & Michael W. Smith
Skillet
Mandisa
 For King and Country
Audio Adrenaline
Moriah Peters
We As Human
City Harbor

Saturday, September 7:
Newsboys
TobyMac
Francesca Battistelli
Group 1 Crew
Building 429
 Plumb
Matthew West
Jamie Grace

2012

Friday, September 7:
Casting Crowns
Chris Tomlin
NEEDTOBREATHE
Red
Francesca Battistelli
Brandon Heath
Royal Tailor
Disciple

Saturday, September 8:
MercyMe
Third Day
Kutless
Thousand Foot Krutch
Lecrae
Chris August

2011

Friday, September 9:
Skillet
Newsboys
Jeremy Camp
Disciple (band)
Sidewalk Prophets
Francesca Battistelli
Group 1 Crew
Matthew West

Saturday, September 10:
MercyMe
TobyMac
Jars of Clay
Sanctus Real
Kutless
Marvin Sapp
VaShawn Mitchell
Chris August

2010

Friday, September 10:
Chris Tomlin
David Crowder*Band
Casting Crowns
BarlowGirl
Thousand Foot Krutch
Group 1 Crew
Tenth Avenue North
Sidewalk Prophets

Saturday, September 11:
MercyMe
Third Day
Family Force 5
Smokie Norful
Red
Lecrae
Day of Fire
Britt Nicole

The event returned to Magic Kingdom after two years of being held at Disney's Hollywood Studios.

Early Years (1983-2009)

2009

Friday, September 11:
Above the Golden State
Abandon
Josh Wilson
Chris Tomlin
P.O.D.
Newsboys
Kutless
Needtobreathe
Leeland
Superchick

Saturday, September 12:
Above the Golden State
Abandon
Josh Wilson
MercyMe
Flyleaf
Skillet
Jars of Clay
Family Force 5
GRITS
Mandisa

The official 2009 lineup was announced in March 2009. It featured more rock bands than usual and incorporated three acts common to both days of the performance, following "Conversations" with acts performing one of the two days. This is the final Night of Joy held at Disney's Hollywood Studios.

2008

Friday, September 5:
Chris Tomlin
MercyMe
Rebecca St. James
BarlowGirl
Matthew West
Rush of Fools
Brandon Heath
Britt Nicole

Saturday, September 6:
Casting Crowns
tobyMac
Music in the Rockies (Best of Show winner from GMA)
Fred Hammond
Marcos Witt
Mandisa
Aaron Shust
Red (band)
pureNRG

This is the first of two consecutive events held at Disney's Hollywood Studios. Previously, Night of Joy was held exclusively at the Magic Kingdom theme park.

2007

Friday, September 7:
Third Day
Chris Tomlin
David Crowder Band
Jaci Velasquez
Brian Littrell
BarlowGirl
Leeland
Jessie Daniels
Sanctus Real

Saturday, September 8:
Newsboys
Steven Curtis Chapman
Salvador
Mark Schultz
Smokie Norful
Kutless
Red
Mary Mary
Flyleaf
Music in the Rockies

2006

Friday, September 8:
BarlowGirl
Casting Crowns
MercyMe
Rebecca St. James
David Crowder Band
Vicky Beeching
Matthew West
Todd Agnew
Building 429

Saturday, September 9:
BarlowGirl
TobyMac
Kirk Franklin
Smokie Norful
Jeremy Camp
Crystal Stark
The Afters
ZOEgirl
Hawk Nelson

2005

Friday, September 9:
MercyMe
Casting Crowns
Audio Adrenaline
Steven Curtis Chapman
Mark Shultz
Big Daddy Weave
Nicole C. Mullen
Matthew West
Vicky Beeching

Saturday, September 10:
Newsboys
CeCe Winans
Donnie McClurkin
TobyMac
Kutless
Superchick
Further Seems Forever
Tree63
Stellar Kart
Kierra Sheard

2004

Friday, September 9:
Michael W. Smith
Avalon
Jars of Clay
Point of Grace
FFH
4HIM
Mark Shultz
Across the Sky

Saturday, September 10:
Third Day
Skillet
Stryper
Rebecca St. James
SONICFLOOd
Steven Curtis Chapman
downhere
Warren Barfield

Sunday, September 11:
Kirk Franklin
Jaci Velasquez
CeCe Winans
Salvador
Jump 5
Jeremy Camp
Joy Williams
12 Stones

2003

Friday, September 5:
Petra
Jars of Clay
Michael W. Smith
Stacie Orrico
Rebecca St. James
Nicole C. Mullen
Switchfoot
downhere
Daily Planet

Saturday, September 6:
The O.C. Supertones
Point of Grace
ZOEGirl
Kirk Franklin
Rachael Lampa
Salvador
Freddie Colloca
Yolanda Adams

2002

Friday, September 6:
Plus One
Kirk Franklin
Benjamin Gate
Mary Mary
Steven Curtis Chapman
ZOEgirl
Natalie Grant
Phat Chance

Saturday, September 7:
Petra
Audio Adrenaline
Michael W. Smith
Jaci Velasquez
Stacie Orrico
Plus One
Joy Williams
Jump5

2001

Friday, September 7:
Kirk Franklin
Jars of Clay
Plus One
Jaci Velasquez
Staci Orrico
Rachael Lampa
Salvador

Saturday, September 8:
Michael W. Smith
Jars of Clay
Plus One
Anointed
Rebecca St. James
Whisper Loud
Salvador

2000
Newsboys
Jaci Velasquez
Out of Eden
Plumb
Raze
CeCe Winans

1999
Michael W. Smith
Fred Hammond
Delirious?
Jaci Velasquez
Avalon
Audio Adrenaline
Out of Eden

1998
God's Property
Jars of Clay
Avalon
Third Day
Bob Carlisle
Greg Long

1997
Steven Curtis Chapman
Jars of Clay
NewSong
Anointed
Sarah Masen
Hezekiah Walker

1996
dc Talk
Michael W. Smith
Newsboys
Hezekiah Walker
Rebecca St. James
Clay Crosse

1995
Carman
Steven Curtis Chapman
Audio Adrenaline
Shirley Caesar
Point of Grace

1994
dc Talk
Twila Paris
Geoff Moore & The Distance
Point of Grace
Richard Smallwood Singers
Whiteheart

1993
Carman
Steven Curtis Chapman
4HIM
Shirley Caesar
Bruce Carroll
Susan Ashton

1992
Petra
dc Talk
The Winans
Steven Curtis Chapman
Geoff Moore & The Distance
Cindy Morgan

1991
Petra
Stryper
REZ

1990
Shirley Caesar
Carman
Steven Curtis Chapman
DeGarmo & Key
Petra
REZ

1989
Margaret Becker & the Reckoning
Shirley Caesar
Phil Keaggy
Petra
REZ
Michael W Smith
Take 6

1988
Geoff Moore & the Distance
Mylon & Broken Heart
Stryper
Russ Taff
Take 6
White Heart
BeBe & CeCe Winans

1987
Kim Boyce
The Clark Sisters
Benny Hester
The Imperials
Petra
Michael W Smith
Randy Stonehill
Greg X Volz

1986
Darrell Mansfield
Leon Patillo
Petra
Stryper
Russ Taff
Sheila Walsh
The Winans

1985

Friday, May 7:
The Archers
Phillip Bailey
Debby Boone
Andraé Crouch
Phil Driscoll
Glad

Friday and Saturday, September 6 and 7:
AD (band)
David and the Giants
David Meece
Michael W Smith
Petra
White Heart

Night of Joy 1985 is the only instance where an event occurred outside of September.

1984
Debby Boone
Clark Sisters
Dion
Amy Grant
Darrell Mansfield
Leon Patillo
REZ

1983
Leon Patillo (First performer to headline Disney's Night of Joy.)
Shirley Caesar
Petra
Phil Keaggy
Sheila Walsh
Benny Hester
David Meece
Scott Wesley Brown

References

Recurring events established in 1983
Christian music festivals
Music festivals in Orlando, Florida
Christianity in Orlando, Florida
Tourist attractions in Orange County, Florida
1983 establishments in Florida